A veteran tree (also known as an ancient tree) is a tree of a great cultural, landscape or nature conservation value due its great age, size or condition.

Definition
Ancient trees vary in age depending on species and location but may be up to several hundred years old. Smaller and shorter-lived tree species (such as orchard trees) may begin to develop some veteran features when only a few decades old. Size is typically used to define veteran trees. Alternatively, different girths may be set for species of different sizes, and the presence of other veteran tree features may also be considered.

Ancient trees often have features of particularly high nature conservation value, such as dead limbs, hollows, rot-holes, water pools, seepages, woodpecker holes, splits, loose bark, limbs reaching the ground, and epiphytic plants and lichens.  Few of these features are found on younger trees, and they provide habitats for very many species of animals and fungi, some of which are rare. Such features are sometimes removed or damaged by pruning or other arboricultural practices.

Many of the oldest trees are pollards. Pollarding is a method of heavily pruning trees by cutting the tree above the browse height of animals. This cultural activity has largely died out in the UK, except with street trees. 

Ancient trees occur in many situations, occasionally in dense woodland, but more commonly as hedgerow trees, on village greens, and in ancient parks and other wood pastures.

United Kingdom
Ancient trees occur more frequently in Great Britain than in many other parts of northern Europe. In the United Kingdom in recent years, these trees are being recorded by the Ancient Tree Hunt so that a national database can be created.  Mass participation by thousands of eager volunteers led to the success of this initiative.

Although some initiatives have strict rules on how to measure the girth and use GPS devices to document the location of such trees accurately, other schemes rely on members of the public to report large trees.  The public has been encouraged to hug big trees in their area to get a measure of their size and report their findings to Natural England or another veteran tree organization. 19th-century maps are also being used to find old trees in places such as Cambridgeshire.

Australia

In Australia, veteran trees are often connected with the social, cultural, and legal practices of the aboriginal peoples. More recent European history of settlement has also produced historical linkages through individual trees that have survived.

Existing prominent trees were often used as survey points indicating boundaries of both private and government land tenure. Some trees hold an exalted position because they were marked (blazed) by 19th-century explorers.

Australia does not have the history of commons and parklands that help explain these landscape forms elsewhere. The new settlers did however bring with them an appreciation of the value of trees for fuel, fodder and raw material for building; many of them also showed an appreciation of the amenity value of trees, planting large spreading shade trees on their properties and within their new founded towns and cities.

Many of the ancient trees identified today are living reminders of the previous patterns of settlement, reflecting the economic, cultural and social organization influencing the lives of those living on the land. They often display the physical scars of traumatic events both man-made and natural. A tree like this is said to have been veteranized.

There is legislation (in the form of national, state and local laws) that recognizes the importance of protecting the environment, but activists have identified gaps in the protection afforded veteran trees, particularly in the face of ever-increasing pressures of urban development.

Italy 

In Italy, general features required in order to identify an Albero Monumentale (literally "monumental tree") are defined by national law number 10 of 14 January 2013 Norme per lo sviluppo degli spazi verdi urbani, which also requires Italian municipalities (comuni) to take a census of their veteran trees. Defining local standards, census details, and law enforcement aspects such as fines or subsidies related to veteran trees is a matter transferred to the regions, which usually implement specific leggi regionali ('regional laws').

Silviculture and veterans

Silviculture originally was developed to provide timber from forests run as plantations, but now forestry expands to consider non-economic values and ecological values. As a result, these other values are also considered in silvicultural systems that may lead to veteran trees being supported where they exist or created where they have not previously been so considered. The Shelterwood with reserves method is a form of Shelterwood cutting that may do this.

See also

 List of oldest trees
 Tree preservation order
 Ancient woodland

References

External links

 The Veteran Tree Group Australia blog
 Ancient Tree Forum
 The Future for Veteran Trees.  English Nature, 2000.  
 English Heritage: Veteran Trees information — English Heritage
 Veteran Trees Management Handbook, English Nature, 2000.  
 Monumental Trees gives, oldest, tallest and biggest trees across the world.

Trees
Forest ecology
Environmental terminology